Vijay Singh Chauhan (born 21 January 1949) is a former Indian athlete who won gold medal in decathlon in 1974 Asian Games. He participated in 1972 Olympics. He was born in 1949 in AgraUttar Pradesh state. He was honoured with Arjuna award. Asia's iron man .

References 

Indian male long jumpers
Athletes (track and field) at the 1972 Summer Olympics
Olympic athletes of India
Recipients of the Arjuna Award
Athletes from Uttar Pradesh
Asian Games gold medalists for India
1949 births
Living people
Indian decathletes
Indian male high jumpers
Indian male triple jumpers
Asian Games medalists in athletics (track and field)
Medalists at the 1974 Asian Games
Athletes (track and field) at the 1970 British Commonwealth Games
Athletes (track and field) at the 1974 Asian Games
Commonwealth Games competitors for India
20th-century Indian people